The following is a partial list of unnumbered trans-Neptunian objects for principal designations assigned within 2014. As of April 2022, it contains a total of 432 bodies. For more information see the description on the main page. Also see list for the previous and next year.

2014

References 
 

Lists of trans-Neptunian objects